Merugu Nagarjuna is an Indian politician, Minister for Social Welfare
Andhra Pradesh and Member of Legislative Assembly belonging to Yuvajana Sramika Raitu Congress Party. He represents Vemuru assembly constituency.

Early life
Merugu Nagarjuna is a native of Vellaturu village, Bhattiprolu mandal, Guntur district.
He was born on June 15, 1966 to Koteswara Rao in Vellaturu village, Bhattiprolu mandal, Guntur district.

Education
In 1994, Merugu Nagarjuna completed his Master of Commerce, Master of Philosophy, Doctor of Philosophy in Andhra University.
He worked as a Professor of Andhra University in Visakhapatnam.

Political career
Merugu Nagarjuna started his political journey with the Congress Party and Nagarjuna is very active in student politics from his childhood. He became an activist of Indian National Congress party by Y. S. Rajasekhara Reddy and later on he served as Chairman of SC, ST Commission Andhra Pradesh. He then gradually rose in Yuvajana Sramika Raitu Congress Party (YSRCP).

Merugu Nagarjuna joined the YSRCP and early he served as President of SC CELL Andhra Pradesh state of the YSR Congress Party. He has served as a Convenor of YSRCP. He served as an Official Spokesperson. In 2019, Nagarjuna is the current MLA (Member of the Legislative Assembly) of YSRCP in Vemuru constituency, Guntur district, Andhra Pradesh.

References

YSR Congress Party politicians
Living people
People from Guntur district
Andhra Pradesh MLAs 2014–2019
1966 births
Andhra Pradesh MLAs 2019–2024